The Tatra 148 was a truck produced in Czechoslovakia by the Tatra company.

History 
In 1969 Tatra decided to modernize the existing T138 model with a number of improvements and design changes. The new model series was designated T148. Designers were tasked with the requirements of increasing engine power, vehicle speed and reliability as well as meeting stricter noise and emission regulations.

Design and technology 
Yet again design continued with the proven central backbone tube construction and power train integrated into the central backbone tube as a modular concept in 4x4 and 6x6 configuration. A new feature was the inter-axle differential. The main advantages of the central load carrying backbone tube are in its high torsion and bend strength, which protects the truck body against load stresses. The secondary advantage is that it houses all important parts of the drive train as well as it enables a concept of modular construction where designers and customers can specify 4 and 6 wheel drive, as well as various length wheelbase combinations.

Engine 
The improved powerplant had its stroke lifted by 10 mm while the bore remained the same. The displacement was lifted to 12.6 litres which resulted in increased horsepower and torque. For military variants the engines were capable of running on alternative fuels (mixtures of diesel fuel, gasoline and or aviation kerosine fuel), albeit with a performance loss. The air cooling system was retained once again with the cooling fan driven via hydraulic clutch and engine oil temperature controlled. The fuel injection pumps featured different types variable or combination governors depending on the vehicle application.

Chassis 
Full length backbone tube with independent swing half axles in 4x4 and 6x6. On 6x6 models front axle suspension via adjustable torsion bars, rear axles suspended by longitudinal semi elliptic leaf springs. For 4x4 configuration rear axle was also suspended via torsion bars. Manually selectable front drive via homo-kinetic driveshafts, constant rear drive with the axle locks standard on all models.
Front track = 
Rear track = 
Wheelbase = model specific
T148 S1, S3 = +
T148 VNM  =  +
T148 NTt 6x6 = +
T148 NTt 4x4 = 
Ground clearance =

Transmission 
The main gearbox was located behind the cabin and connected to the engine clutch housing via a short uni joint shaft (this design enables the so-called flat floor cabin) which was bolted together with the auxiliary gearbox to the backbone tube and formed the main part of the chassis structure. Options for rear power take off and winch drive were also possible. The main and auxiliary gears were fully synchronized except the first and reverse gear.

 Main gearbox – 5+1  (2-5 gear synchronized)
 gear ratios – (1)9.97, (2)4.96, (3)2.83, (4)1.68, (5)1.0,  (R)8.58
Auxiliary gearbox – 2 speed  (electro-pneumatic control via switch on the gear lever and clutch pedal activated )
 gear ratios – (L)2.20,  (H)1.62
Step down transfer case
 Clutch – 2x plate dry (clutch pedal hydraulic  and power assisted)
 Differentials – 1x front 2x rear (6x6 models) 1x front 1x rear (4x4 models)
 final drive ratios – 3.39

Brakes 
Full compressed air brakes acting on all wheels
 Main wheel brakes   ---->   dual circuit  drum brakes adjustable "S" cam type
 Park brake   ---->   mechanical via output shaft at the back of the gearbox
 Supplementary brake ---->    exhaust brake electro-pneumatically controlled

Bodywork 
The Tatra T148 featured an all-steel two door cabin with a fully suspended drivers seat and a bench seat for two occupants. Special military variants included a hatch opening on the roof. The vehicle featured an independent auxiliary cab heater and included cyclone pre-cleaners mounted on the front mudguards. The vehicle's top speed was approximately 80 km/h up to   GVM (T148 S3) or a total truck and trailer combination of up to  GCM (T148 S3).

Production 
Production of the T148 started in 1972 and ended in December 1982 where a total of 113,647 vehicles left the production line. Total export figures rested at approximately 63,700 units sold in 43 countries around the world, where traditionally the biggest export user was the USSR.
 Primary models
 Tatra T148 S1 6x6 – One way tipper
 Tatra T148 S3 6x6 – Three way tipper
 Tatra T148  V S1 6x6 – High-lift  one way tipper
 Tatra T148 V 6x6 – Flatbed civilian
 Tatra T148 VNM 6x6 – Flatbed w/winch troops and cargo military special
 Tatra T148 NTt 6x6 – Tractor
 Tatra T148 NTt 4x4 – Tractor
 Tatra T148 Pxx – Bodybuilders chassis for special use e.g. tanker, crane, excavator

References 

 Modern Utility Automobiles TATRA by design team of N.P. Tatra Kopŕivnice, 1979, Naśe Vojsko, Prague, First edition

External links 

 Tatra a.s.
 Tatra Portal
 Unofficial Tatra trucks pages

T148
Cars of the Czech Republic
All-wheel-drive vehicles
Trucks of the Czech Republic
Vehicles introduced in 1972